The Charles Kent House, also known as the Palmer House, is a historic structure in Kent, Ohio, United States. It has been listed on the National Register of Historic Places since February 23, 1978. An example of Gothic Revival architecture, the house also features elements of the Greek Revival and Carpenter Gothic architectural styles. It was built in 1843 as the home of Charles Kent, son of Zenas Kent and brother of Marvin Kent, the namesake of the city of Kent. Martin L. Davey, who would later serve as mayor of Kent, followed by U.S. Representative, and eventually as Governor of Ohio, persuaded the owner to move the house to avoid demolition. Owned for many years by Dr. Maurice and Louisa Palmer, it also was known as Palmer House when it was listed on the National Register. It was painted white with blue shutters. The present color scheme was changed following its sale by the Palmer estate in the early 2000s.

See also
 History of Kent, Ohio
 National Register of Historic Places listings in Portage County, Ohio

References

National Register of Historic Places in Portage County, Ohio
History of Kent, Ohio
Houses on the National Register of Historic Places in Ohio
Greek Revival houses in Ohio
Carpenter Gothic houses in Ohio
Houses completed in 1843
Houses in Portage County, Ohio
1843 establishments in Ohio